Brashear may refer to:

People
 Brashear (surname)

Places
 Brashear, Missouri, town in Missouri
 Brashear, Texas, unincorporated community in Texas
 Brashear City, former name of Morgan City, Louisiana

Other uses
 Brashear High School, Pittsburgh, Pennsylvania
 Brashear (lunar crater), crater on the Moon
 Brashear (Martian crater), crater on Mars
 5502 Brashear, asteroid

See also
Brashears (disambiguation)